Cleatus Lavon Davidson (born November 1, 1976) is a former Major League Baseball infielder.

From 2003 to 2008, Davidson played for independent teams. In 2008, he played for the Long Beach Armada of the Golden Baseball League.

External links

1976 births
Living people
Major League Baseball infielders
Minnesota Twins players
Gulf Coast Twins players
Elizabethton Twins players
Fort Wayne Wizards players
Fort Myers Miracle players
New Britain Rock Cats players
Mobile BayBears players
Norwich Navigators players
New Haven Ravens players
Columbus Clippers players
Elmira Pioneers players
Mesa Miners players
North Shore Spirit players
Alexandria Aces players
Camden Riversharks players
Long Beach Armada players
Baseball players from Florida
Sportspeople from Bartow, Florida